The 14th British Academy Film Awards, given by the British Academy of Film and Television Arts in 1961, honoured the best films of 1960.

Winners and nominees

Best Film
 The Apartment 
The Angry Silence
Inherit the Wind
Let's Make Love
Elmer Gantry
Shadows
Saturday Night and Sunday Morning
Spartacus
Tunes of Glory
The Trials of Oscar Wilde
La Dolce Vita
Hiroshima mon amour
Orfeu Negro
Pote tin Kyriaki
Le testament d'Orphée
Les Quatre cents coups
L'Avventura

Best British Film
Saturday Night and Sunday Morning

The Angry Silence
The Trials of Oscar Wilde
Tunes of Glory

Best Foreign Actor
 Jack Lemmon in The Apartment 
George Hamilton in Crime & Punishment, USA
Burt Lancaster in Elmer Gantry
Fredric March in Inherit the Wind
Spencer Tracy in Inherit the Wind
Yves Montand in Let's Make Love

Best British Actor
 Peter Finch in The Trials of Oscar Wilde 
Richard Attenborough in The Angry Silence
Laurence Olivier in The Entertainer
Albert Finney in Saturday Night and Sunday Morning
John Fraser in The Trials of Oscar Wilde
Alec Guinness in Tunes of Glory
John Mills in Tunes of Glory

Best British Actress
 Rachel Roberts in Saturday Night and Sunday Morning
Hayley Mills in Pollyanna
Wendy Hiller in Sons and Lovers

Best Foreign Actress Shirley MacLaine in The Apartment Pier Angeli in The Angry Silence
Monica Vitti in L'Avventura
Jean Simmons in Elmer Gantry
Emmanuelle Riva in Hiroshima mon amour
Melina Mercouri in Pote tin Kyriaki

Best British Screenplay The Angry Silence - Bryan Forbes '''

References

Film014
British Academy Film Awards
British Academy Film Awards